Diego Potap (born 1 July 1970) is an Argentine wrestler. He competed in the men's Greco-Roman 82 kg at the 1992 Summer Olympics.

References

External links
 

1970 births
Living people
Argentine male sport wrestlers
Olympic wrestlers of Argentina
Wrestlers at the 1992 Summer Olympics
Place of birth missing (living people)
20th-century Argentine people
21st-century Argentine people